Angélica Maria Ribeiro André (born 13 October 1994) is a Portuguese swimmer specialising in open water events. She competed in the women's 10 km event at the 2019 World Aquatics Championships and she finished in 19th place. She also competed in the women's 25 km event, but did not finish the race.

References

External links
 

1994 births
Living people
Sportspeople from Matosinhos
Portuguese female swimmers
Female long-distance swimmers
Swimmers at the 2020 Summer Olympics
Olympic swimmers of Portugal
20th-century Portuguese women
21st-century Portuguese women